Hasan Abdulnabi (born 12 February 1989) is a Bahraini tennis player.

Abdulnabi has a career high ATP singles ranking of 1697 achieved on 7 April 2014.

Abdulnabi represents Bahrain at the Davis Cup, where he has a W/L record of 30–34.

References

External links

1989 births
Living people
Bahraini male tennis players
Sportspeople from Manama